Fleurs d'amour, fleurs d'amitié was a Canadian variety television series which aired on Radio-Canada in 1968.

Premise
Hosts Nanette Workman (credited as Nanette) and Tony Roman hosted this psychedelic variety series on location from the Expo 67 grounds. The hosts were publicly dubbed "Québec's Sonny & Cher".

Scheduling
The half-hour series aired Sunday mornings from 16 June to 22 September 1968.

References

External links
 

Ici Radio-Canada Télé original programming
1968 Canadian television series debuts
1968 Canadian television series endings
1960s Canadian variety television series